The 1923 Rhode Island Rams football team was an American football team that represented Rhode Island State College (later renamed the University of Rhode Island) as a member of the New England Conference during the 1923 college football season. In its fourth season under head coach Frank Keaney, the team compiled a 4–4 record (0–3 against conference opponents) and finished in last place in the conference. The team failed to score in seven of its eight games.

Schedule

References

Rhode Island State
Rhode Island Rams football seasons
Rhode Island State Rams football